Udayadityavarman I was the king of Angkor who reigned from 1001 to 1002 AD.

Maternal nephew of his predecessor Jayavarman V (968 – 1001), he reigned only for a few months. His death triggered a nine-year civil war. His successor in Yaśodharapura is a prince of the royal family named Jayavirahvarman (1002 – 1010).

References

Sources
 George Cades , The Hindu States of Indochina and Indonesia , Paris, 1964.

11th-century Cambodian monarchs
Khmer Empire